Bridget Duke-Wooley (12 February 1915 – 6 April 1976) was a British alpine skier. She competed in the women's slalom at the 1948 Winter Olympics.

References

External links
 

1915 births
1976 deaths
British female alpine skiers
Olympic alpine skiers of Great Britain
Alpine skiers at the 1948 Winter Olympics
Sportspeople from Runcorn